John Bradley Dusek (born December 13, 1950) is a former American football linebacker for the Washington Redskins in the National Football League from 1974 to 1981.  He played college football at Texas A&M University and was drafted in the third round of the 1973 NFL Draft by the New England Patriots.
Inducted into Texas A&M Hall of Fame 2014.

1950 births
Living people
Washington Redskins players
Texas A&M Aggies football players
American football linebackers
People from Temple, Texas
Temple High School (Texas) alumni